Women Teachers' Training College, also known as Teachers' Training College (Female) is an educational institution in Mymensingh, Bangladesh. It is the only school of its kind in Bangladesh. As of 1978, it offered bachelor's and master's degrees in Education.

Shashi Lodge 
Suryakanta Acharya Chowdhury, the successor of Muktagacha Zamindar dynasty built a luxurious two-storied palace named Shashi Lodge in the city of Mymensingh after the name of his adopted son Shoshikanta. This magnificent building was decorated with different types of fancy goods which were brought from different places of Paris and Europe. This original place was destructed by the massive earthquake in the 1897 AD. Then this palace was rebuilt in one storied between 1905 and 1911 by Shoshikanta. It is fairly a large area, occupying about nine acres of land, and approached through an imposing semi-circular arched gateway. There is a large grassy lawn with an ornamental marble fountain containing a beautiful classical statue in between the palace and the gateway. There is an old pond on the west side of the central building. There is a two storied bathing pavilion made by marble stone situated in the middle of the pond from the north corner. On entering the palace through the central porch, there is a foyer which leads into large hall with timber floor, which was used originally as a ballroom. Elaborate glass chandeliers were hanged for lighting. The doors and windows were beautifully decorated with the colorful glass. For its outstanding archaeological significance the Department of Archaeology (DOA) declared the monument as a protected monument in 1989 AD.

Campus 

Since 1952, the college has been housed in Shashi Lodge, a landmark building that sits on a  property. The current Shashi Lodge is the second building by this name. The original was built by Maharaja Shurjokanto Acharya Chowdhury and named for his son, Shashikanto Acharya Chowdhury. After the original lodge was destroyed by fire due to the 1897 Assam earthquake, Shashikanto had it rebuilt at a cost of Taka 3 lakh, using materials and instruments imported from Paris. An unusual feature of the 24-room building is a musical staircase.  On the grounds in front of the lodge there is a fountain that has as its centerpiece a stone statue of Venus bathing. Shashi Lodge has been used as a filming location for movies and television plays.

Recent deterioration 
The Lodge building is now deteriorated and is no longer used for classrooms. Modern brick buildings have also been erected on the Shashi Lodge property for the school's use. The national Ministry for Cultural Affairs and Education Ministry agreed in 1995 that Shashi Lodge would be transferred to the Ministry for Cultural Affairs for better preservation and for use by the Mymensingh Museum after new college buildings were built, but this did not occur.

References

Mymensingh
Teacher training colleges in Bangladesh
Women's universities and colleges in Bangladesh
Archaeological sites in Mymensingh district